Senator Taylor may refer to:

Fictional characters
Allison Taylor, a fictional U.S. Senator portrayed by Cherry Jones on the TV series 24

Members of the Northern Irish Senate
Henry Taylor (politician) (1872/1873–1957), Northern Irish Senator from 1938 to 1957

Members of the United States Senate
Glen H. Taylor (1904–1984), U.S. Senator from Idaho from 1945 to 1951
John Taylor (South Carolina governor) (1770–1832), U.S. Senator from South Carolina from 1810 to 1816
John Taylor of Caroline (1753–1824), U.S. Senator from Virginia from 1792 to 1894, in 1803, and from 1822 to 1824
Robert Love Taylor (1850–1912), U.S. Senator from Tennessee from 1907 to 1912
Waller Taylor (1786–1826), U.S. Senator from Indiana from 1816 to 1825

United States state senate members
Bryan Taylor (lawyer) (born 1976), Alabama State Senate
Charles Taylor (North Carolina politician) (born 1941), North Carolina State Senate
Charles Simeon Taylor (1851–1913), Wisconsin State Senate
David Taylor (Wisconsin judge) (1818–1891), Wisconsin State Senate
Edmund Dick Taylor (1804–1891), Illinois State Senate
Edward T. Taylor (1858–1941), Colorado State Senate
Fredrick Monroe Taylor (1901–1988), Idaho State Senate
George Sylvester Taylor (1822–1910), Massachusetts State Senate
George Taylor (Connecticut politician) (1802–1881), Connecticut State Senate
Glen Taylor (born 1941), Minnesota State Senate
Greg Taylor (politician), Indiana State Senate
Henry Wyllys Taylor (1796–1888), Michigan State Senate
Horace Adolphus Taylor (1837–1910), Wisconsin State Senate
Hoyt Patrick Taylor (1890–1964), North Carolina State Senate
Jack Taylor (Arizona politician) (1907–1995), Arizona State Senate
Jack Taylor (Colorado politician) (1935-2020), Colorado State Senate
James Taylor (New Mexico politician) (born 1966), New Mexico State Senate
Janna Taylor (born 1948), Montana  State Senate
Jeff Taylor (politician) (born 1961), Iowa State Senate
Jerry Taylor (politician) (1937–2016), Arkansas State Senate
John C. Taylor (1890–1983), South Carolina State Senate
John Stansel Taylor (1871–1936), Florida State Senate
John W. Taylor (politician) (1784–1854), New York State Senate
John Taylor (Taylor Ham) (1837–1909), New Jersey Senate
Jonathan Taylor (congressman) (1796–1848), Ohio State Senate
Kathleen Taylor (politician), Oregon State Senate
Larry Gene Taylor (1953–2005), Missouri State Senate
Larry Taylor (politician) (born 1960), Texas State Senate
Leah Landrum Taylor (born 1966), Arizona State Senate
Lena Taylor (born 1966), Wisconsin State Senate
M. D. K. Taylor (1818–1897), Texas State Senate
M. Harvey Taylor (1876–1982), Pennsylvania State Senate
Mark Taylor (American politician) (born 1957), Georgia State Senate
Mary Jo Taylor (born 1953), Kansas State Senate
Mike Taylor (Montana politician) (born 1941), Montana State Senate
Nelson Taylor Jr. (1854–1912), Connecticut State Senate
Nelson Taylor (1821–1894), California State Senate
Ray Taylor (politician) (1923–2015), Iowa State Senate
Rich Taylor (politician) (born 1954), Iowa State Senate
Richard Taylor (Confederate general) (1826–1879), Louisiana State Senate
Robert Taylor (congressman) (1763–1845), Virginia State Senate
Robin L. Taylor (born 1943), Alaska State Senate
Ryan Taylor (politician) (born 1970), North Dakota State Senate
Samuel Taylor (Virginian) (1781–1853), Virginia State Senate
Stratton Taylor (born 1956), Oklahoma State Senate
Van Taylor (born 1972), Texas State Senate
Vincent A. Taylor (1845–1922), Ohio State Senate
William H. Taylor (judge) (1863–1926), Vermont State Senate
William Robert Taylor (1820–1909), Wisconsin State Senate

See also
John Tayler (1742–1829), New York State Senate
Robert Walker Tayler Sr. (1812–1878), Ohio State Senate
John Tayloe III (1770–1828), Virginia State Senate